Lyrica Okano (born ) is an American actress. She is known for playing the role of Nico Minoru in the Hulu original series Runaways.

Biography
Lyrica Okano was born to parents who emigrated from Tokyo, Japan. They came to the United States in the early 1990s to join the punk rock scene. Her mother ended up becoming an IT tech and her father became a teacher who taught Japanese. At the age of four, she began taking Olympic gymnastics and nearly competed professionally. She stopped taking gymnastics when she was 14 when "[she] realized [she] didn't have any social skills". She was bullied in school for being the only Asian-American girl in her class and when she briefly transferred to Kyoto, she was bullied there as well due to her elementary Japanese-language skills and American mannerisms. Lyrica did manage to befriend a fellow actress, Yuka Taga, whom she would later collaborate with. Her first major role was as Nico Minoru on Runaways, a Hulu original series which was first released in 2017.

Filmography

References

External links

1994 births
Living people
21st-century American actresses
American actresses of Japanese descent